Walter Melrose (October 26, 1889– May 30, 1973) was a music publisher and lyricist in the 1920s and 1930s.

Background

He was born in Sumner, Illinois, and was the brother of Lester Melrose, with whom he established a music store in Chicago. This became successful after the Tivoli Theatre opened in the same street, greatly increasing the amount of passing trade. Melrose branched into music publishing when Jelly Roll Morton turned up in his store, and hits such as Wolverine Blues and King Porter Stomp became highly successful for the company. In 1926 he arranged a series of recordings for Victor Records by Morton's Red Hot Peppers, which have come to be regarded as landmarks of early jazz. He later parted company with Morton acrimoniously, and stopped paying him royalties for his compositions.

Major publications
He and his brother published the jazz standard "Tin Roof Blues" composed by the New Orleans Rhythm Kings" in 1923. He also wrote the lyrics to that song.

Melrose added lyrics to many existing jazz compositions that his company published, such as "Copenhagen". He established one of the major publishing companies with his brother, known as Melrose Brothers Music: The House That Blues Built.

Other publications
Melrose Music also published Glenn Miller's 125 Jazz Breaks for Trombone, Louis Armstrong's 125 Jazz Breaks for Cornet, and Benny Goodman's 24 Hot Breaks for Clarinet in 1928.

References 

Walter Melrose had contributed to many songs and lyrics and has a broad discography after he died. Walter Melrose died in May of 1973, in Lake Barington, Illinois. Officially, he was a music publisher but did receive credits for several songs with the original  Dixieland jazz band, including the songs "High Society" and "Tin Roof Blues". Both were hits in the late 1950s. 

The Music Goes Round And Round
Eigenvertrieb / DSCMusic 2014001
Martinique
2007

Martinique
Earworks.ch
Piano Solo. Plays Blues And Ballads
2005

Piano Solo. Plays Blues And Ballads
Jazz Connaisseur / JCCD 9107-2
Buona Sera New Orleans
2002

Buona Sera New Orleans
Eigenvertrieb / TBH 602
For Louis
2000

For Louis
Concord / CCD-4879-2
Jazz Club Trio - Plus
1995

Jazz Club Trio - Plus
Elite Special / TCD 7935
Mo' Cream From The Crop
1994

Mo' Cream From The Crop
Sony Music Entertainment Switzerland GmbH / CK 66628
Nothing But The Blues
1994

Businesspeople from Chicago
American lyricists
1889 births
1973 deaths
People from Sumner, Illinois
American music publishers (people)
20th-century American businesspeople